the 2011 Focus Cup was a football friendly tournament for the national teams of Jordan, Kuwait, Saudi Arabia and Iraq.
take place during the July 2011 window of the FIFA International Match Calendar. The tournament was organized by Jordan Football Association and sponsored by Focus Oil. all matches held at Amman International Stadium.

Participants 
  Iraq
  Kuwait
  Saudi Arabia
  Jordan

Results

Semi-finals

Third place match

Final

Statistics

Goalscorers

See also
2011 Kuwait national football team results

References

International men's association football invitational tournaments
International association football competitions hosted by Jordan
2010–11 in Kuwaiti football
2011–12 in Kuwaiti football
Sports competitions in Amman
2011 in Asian football
Focus Cup